Nanterre-La Folie station is a railway station in Nanterre, Hauts-de-Seine, France. Former it was a cargo station of SNCF. Today, passenger station is under construction and scheduled to open in 2023. It relates to the extension of RER E to Mantes-la-Jolie station. It is also scheduled  in 2030 to open stations on lines 15, 17, and 18 in Grand Paris Express plan for Paris Métro. It will be connected with Nanterre-Préfecture station on the RER A by foot on the ground.

Next station 
RER E:Houilles–Carrières-sur-Seine - Nanterre-La Folie - La Defense (future)

References

External links
 (Grand Paris Express)

Réseau Express Régional
Railway stations in Hauts-de-Seine
Transport in Paris
Railway stations scheduled to open in 2024